Dương Văn Ngộ (born 1930) is a retired Vietnamese postal worker and polyglot public letter writer known for being the longest-serving and last public letter writer and translator in Vietnam, having written thousands of letters over three decades across the world from his desk in the Saigon Central Post Office with 70 years of total service in the postal service until his retirement in 2021.

Early life and career 

Dương Văn Ngộ was born in 1930 in Phú Lâm, District 6, Saigon (now Ho Chi Minh City), as the fifth of six children in a family with Hoa (Vietnamese Chinese) ancestry. His father worked in the trades, while his mother did not hold a steady job, instead mending sacks on an ad hoc basis for money. In 1942, Ngộ became one of the few impoverished people accepted to the prestigious Petrus Ký High School (now named Lê Hồng Phong High School For The Gifted). He started showing a strong interest in the mail system from when he was 16 years old, when he began working at the Thị Nghè district post office. He became an official employee at the Saigon Central Post Office starting in 1948. He started out sorting letters into boxes, later taking on a number of other roles throughout his career. In addition, Ngộ was also temporarily transferred to the Ministry of Transport and Post. When he was 36, the post office sent him off to learn English and French for his duties. According to Ngộ, he went to Phú Lâm Primary School to study French and then became proficient in English with the help of the board of directors, who made arrangements for him to study at the Vietnamese-American association. There, he got special guidance from an American pilot to enhance his fluency in foreign languages.

Although he was eligible to retire and collect a pension in 1990, Ngộ instead requested to be assigned to the public letter-writing service (also known as letters for hire), which only had six people at the time. Eventually, all of the other writers passed away, leaving Ngộ as the last one. He convinced the post office to give him a desk at the end of the hall where he could offer his services. From Monday to Friday, Ngộ regularly worked from 8 in the morning to 3:30 in the afternoon, and also helps provide information for visitors. He was commonly seen with his black bag, which contained various materials, including dictionaries, for his work. Ngộ is able to parse letters written in German, French and English in addition to his native Vietnamese, and can write them in French and English as well. Since 1990, he has written letters to recipients all across the globe. Ngộ not only perceived the position as a way to make a living, but also as a labor of love and a way to publicize and promote Vietnam. While the shift to digital forms of communication has reduced the number of people seeking his services, he remained popular, with many people and tourists taking pictures of him. In 2021, he was forced to retire due to his age and weakening senses, although he still attempted to sneak in and continue working.

Personal life 
Ngộ is married to a woman who was also born in 1930. They have six children; two sons and four daughters. One daughter has an intellectual disorder, thus having to rely on her elder sister for care. However, he has boasted that all of his children perform well in their studies.

Reception 
Ngộ has gained various titles and nicknames from the Vietnamese press for his work, and was officially recognized by the Vietnam Records Book Center as the longest-serving public letter writer in 2009. Afterwards, many people came to the post office to see him in action, noting that he was the last writer in Saigon, and then Vietnam in general. In 2016, he received a prize and 20 million VND from the Kova Priza Committee. He later became featured in international media outlets. He met with Herman Van Rompuy, then President of the European Council, in 2012. Some have considered him a hallmark of the Saigon Central Post Office.

References

External links 
  (Vietnamese with English subtitles)

1930 births
Living people
Communications in Vietnam